Pfäffikon SZ railway station is a junction station serving Pfäffikon, the principal town of the municipality of Freienbach, in the canton of Schwyz (SZ), Switzerland. The station is situated at the northern edge of the town, between the town centre and Lake Zurich.

The station forms part of the Lake Zurich left bank railway line, which links Zürich Hauptbahnhof with Ziegelbrücke and Näfels, and is owned and operated by the Swiss Federal Railways (SBB). To the east of the station is the junction for the line to Rapperswil, which crosses Lake Zurich on the Seedamm, whilst to the west is the junction for the line to Arth-Goldau; both these latter being owned and operated by the Südostbahn (SOB).

The station should not be confused with Pfäffikon ZH railway station, which is in Pfäffikon, canton of Zürich.

Services 
 the following services stop at Pfäffikon SZ:

 InterRegio:
 Zürich S-Bahn:
 Nighttime S-Bahn (only during weekends):

Südostbahn operates the two InterRegio services and the S40; Swiss Federal Railways operates the other Zürich S-Bahn services. During weekends, there are also two nighttime S-Bahn services (SN5 and SN8) offered by ZVV.

Layout and connections 
Pfäffikon has two  island platforms with two tracks each ( 2–3; 5–6) and one  side platform with a single track (No. 7). Adjacent to the station is the Pfäffikon bus terminal. PostAuto Schweiz and AHW Busbetriebe (for the municipality of Freienbach) operate bus services to Ziegelbrücke, Siebnen, Feusisberg, Richterswil and Freienbach.

Gallery

See also
 History of rail transport in Switzerland
 Rail transport in Switzerland

References

Further reading

External links
 
 

Railway stations in the canton of Schwyz
Swiss Federal Railways stations
Freienbach